Rail transport in South Africa is an important element of the country's transport infrastructure. All major cities are connected by rail, and South Africa's railway system is the most highly developed in Africa. The South African rail industry is publicly owned.

History 

The first railway was from Cape Town to Wellington and was worked by a small locomotive in 1859. The first passenger carrying service was a small line of about  built by the Natal Railway Company, linking the town of Durban with Harbour Point, opened on 26 June 1860. Cape Town had already started building a  line, track gauge , linking Cape Town to Wellington in 1859 but was hampered by delays and could only begin passenger service to the first section of the line to the Eerste River on 13 February 1862. However Cape railway construction began a massive expansion, after the formation in 1872 of the Cape Government Railways.

In the north, in the independent South African Republic, railway construction was done by the Netherlands-South African Railway Company (NZASM), which constructed two major lines: one from Pretoria to Lourenço Marques in Portuguese East Africa Colony, and a shorter line connecting Pretoria to Johannesburg.

Later railway development was driven by Cecil Rhodes, whose original intention was for a railway extending across Africa as a great Cape-Cairo railway linking all the British territories of Africa. However, Rhodes was as much a capitalist in his motivation as a visionary, and when little gold was found in Mashonaland in Southern Rhodesia, he accepted that the scheme to reach Lake Tanganyika had no economic justification. Railways built by private companies without government subsidies need enough of the type of traffic that can pay high freight rates to recover their construction costs. The agricultural products that fuelled much of Rhodesia's early economic growth could not provide this traffic; large quantities of minerals could. Most early railways in Africa were built by the British government rather than by Companies. The need to raise capital and produce dividends prevented most Companies from undertaking such infrastructure investments. However, in the early period of railway construction, BSAC obtained finance from South African companies including Consolidated Gold Fields and De Beers in which Rhodes was a dominant force. BSAC also benefited from the personal fortunes of Rhodes before his death. The railway that had stopped at Mafeking was extended to Bulawayo by October 1897.  The first train arrived in Victoria Falls on the Zambesi in 1904, driven by two women.

A national "link-up" was established in 1898, creating a national transport network. This national network was largely completed by 1910. Though railway lines were also being extended outside of South Africa, as far north as Northern Rhodesia (present-day Zambia), the vision of Cecil John Rhodes, to have a rail system that would run from the "Cape to Cairo", would never materialise.

Upon the merger of four provinces to establish the modern state of South Africa in 1910, the railway lines across the country were also merged. South African Railways and Harbours (SAR & H) was the government agency responsible for, amongst other things, the country's rail system.

Electrification of the railways began in the 1920s with the building of the Colenso Power Station for the Glencoe to Pietermaritzburg route and the introduction of the South African Class 1E.

During the 1980s, the transport industry was reorganised. Instead of being a direct government agency, it was modelled along business lines into a government-owned corporation called Transnet. Transnet Freight Rail (until recently known as Spoornet) is the division of Transnet that runs the rail system. Though there are no plans to end government-ownership of the national rail network, some small portions of the rail system have recently been privatised.

During the COVID-19 pandemic in South Africa the rail system suffered looting.

Network 

Two different public companies operate freight and commuters services: Transnet Freight Rail and PRASA respectively. Transnet Freight Rail is the largest division of Transnet, a State Owned Company (SOC), wholly owned by the Government of the Republic of South Africa and is the custodian of rail, ports and pipelines.

The commuters' network is divided into urban and long-distance routes. Metrorail, the urban commuter transport service present in Gauteng, Western Cape, KwaZulu-Natal and Eastern Cape, is responsible for transporting up to 2 million passengers daily. Shosholoza Meyl used to operate long-distance routes covering the major metros in the country: Johannesburg, Cape Town, Durban, Port Elizabeth and East London. However, after a train collision killing one person in Horizon View west of Johannesburg on 12 February 2020, the Railway Safety Regulator suspended all Shosholoza Meyl train operations indefinitely. The Blue Train is a luxurious passenger train and a popular tourist attraction for South Africa, which runs from Cape Town to Pretoria. It was the winner of the most luxurious train in Africa for the tenth consecutive year in 2019, and the three-time winner of the world's most luxurious train at the World Travel Awards. The Blue Train however, is operated by Transnet Freight Rail.

With the increasing coverage provided by the nation's highway system, long-distance passenger travel has declined in South Africa. While many commuters still use rail for their daily commute, nationally, only half of the nation's  of track is being fully utilised, and some 35% of the nation's track carries no activity or very low activity. Accordingly, Transnet is moving towards an emphasis on freight, rather than passengers, to keep its rail system profitable.

For a look at the South African transport network, including the railways, view this map from the United Nations.

A high-speed rail link has been proposed, between Johannesburg and Durban.

Specifications 
Nearly all railways in South Africa use a  Cape gauge track. This was selected in the 19th century to reduce the cost of building track across and through the mountains found in several parts of the country. The Gautrain rapid transit railway uses  (standard gauge).

During the late 19th century and the early 20th century numerous 2-foot narrow gauge railways were constructed.

South African trains connect through the AAR coupler, developed in the United States at the end of the 19th century. Remarkably, though South Africa has long been ahead of Europe in coupling systems, it has lagged behind most of the world in its braking system; most trains in South Africa continue to use vacuum braking. However, the conversion to air brakes has finally commenced.

Between 50% to 80% of the rail lines in South Africa are electrified. Different voltages are used for different types of trains. Most electrified trains run 3000 V DC (overhead); this is used primarily for commuter lines, and has been in use since the 1920s. During the 1980s, higher voltages (25 kV AC and—much less frequently—50 kV AC (both overhead) have been used for heavy duty lines (which also require more sleepers per mile) primarily used for the transport of iron ore.

Rolling stock 

South Africa uses a variety of rolling stock from a number of manufacturers.

In 1957 Union Carriage & Wagon was founded in Nigel for local production of rolling stock.

Accidents and incidents
* 19 February 1896, a freight train loaded with eight trucks of dynamite was struck by a shunter while unloading. The resulting Braamfontein Explosion was one of the largest artificial non-nuclear explosions in history, killing more than 70 people, and injuring over 200.
 2 February 2002, 24 people died in the 2002 Charlotte's Dale train collision
 26 October 2005, 2005 Deelfontein train collision, head-on collision between the Blue Train and the Shosholoza Meyl
 13 November 2006, Faure level crossing accident, 19 people were killed at a level crossing near Somerset West when a metrorail train collided with a truck carrying farm workers.
 21 April 2010, 3 crew died in the Pretoria runaway of a Rovos Rail train
 25 August 2010, Blackheath level crossing accident, 10 children died as a result of a level crossing crash between a Metrorail commuter train and a minibus taxi.
 13 July 2012. Hectorspruit level crossing accident, at least 25 people were killed at a level crossing near Hectorspruit, Mpumalanga, when a coal train collided with a truck carrying farm workers.
Saturday, 18 July 2015. Johannesburg train crash: Two commuter trains collided and overturned in Johannesburg. ~200 people were injured.

Rail systems in nearby countries 
The following countries mostly use  gauge and are mostly connected together. Countries beyond those listed are of other gauges.

Angola
Botswana
Republic of the Congo – isolated
Democratic Republic of the Congo – half isolated
Eswatini
Lesotho
Malawi
Mozambique (Pretoria–Maputo railway), under repair
Namibia
Tanzania same gauge as far as Dar es Salaam – transshipment to  gauge at Kidatu
Zambia
Zimbabwe

See also 

 Two foot gauge railways in South Africa
 Avontuur Railway
 Cape Government Railways
 Cape gauge
 Flying Dutchman Funicular
 Kei Rail
 Metrorail
 Natal Government Railways
 Netherlands-South African Railway Company
 Shosholoza Meyl
 South African locomotive history
 Transport in South Africa
 Passenger Rail Agency of South Africa
 Transnet
 Rovos Rail
 Gautrain

References

Further reading

External links 

 Ripley, Luke A gricer's guide to the railways of South Africa
 Rail accidents in South Africa
 South African Trains – A Pictorial Encyclopaedia
 African Railway Systems and Consultants
 A collection of SAR&H Publicity and Travel Department photographs